The Xian H-6 is a twin-engine jet bomber of the Chinese People's Liberation Army Air Force (PLAAF). The H-6 is a license-built version of the Soviet Tupolev Tu-16 and remains the primary bomber aircraft of the People's Republic of China.

Delivery of the Tu-16 to China began in 1958, and a license production agreement with the Soviets was signed in the late 1950s. By November 2020, the PLAAF had as many as 231.

The latest variant of the H-6 is the H-6N, a heavily redesigned version capable of aerial refueling and carrying air-launched cruise missiles. According to the United States Department of Defense, this will give the PLAAF a long-range standoff offensive air capability with precision-guided munitions.

History

Having entered service with the Soviet Union in April 1952, the Tupolev Tu-16 was one the Soviets' earliest effective jet bombers with over 1,500 produced through 1962. Early in 1956, the Soviet Union agreed to license production of the Tu-16 to the People's Republic of China. Signed in September 1957, the agreement granted China two production aircraft, a semi-knocked-down (SKD) kit, a complete knock-down (CKD) kit, a set of blanks, and various raw materials to jumpstart Chinese manufacture, all from Plant No. 22 in Kazan, Tartarastan in Soviet Russia. In 1959 a team of Soviet technicians were dispatched to China to assist in the start of Chinese production where they remained until fall 1960. 

The Chinese Bureau of Aircraft Industry selected the Harbin Aircraft Factory and a similar factory in Xi'an to produce the new Tu-16s, requiring major reconstruction and expansion. The aircraft and CKD were sent in May 1959 to Harbin Aircraft Factory and production began shortly after with the first Chinese-built Tu-16 assembled in only 67 days (from 28 June to 3 September 1959, using Soviet-provided CKD). Two weeks later, on 27 September the first Chinese Tu-16 completed its maiden flight and in December was transferred to the PLAAF. In 1961, the Bureau of Aircraft Industry opted to concentrate production at Xi'an and dedicate the Harbin factory to H-5 production. Having completed renovations of the Xi'an factory by 1958, production of the H-6 began in earnest with the first fully domestically produced H-6 bomber making its first flight on 24 December 1968, flown by Li Yuanyi and Xu Wenhong. 

The establishment of China's H-6 production system experienced significant delays and a loss of schematics during the chaos of the Cultural Revolution. 

The H-6 was used to drop nine nuclear devices at the Lop Nur test site.  However, with the increased development in ballistic missile technology, the nuclear delivery capabilities that the H-6 offered diminished in importance. The CIA estimated in 1976 that the H-6 had moved over to a dual nuclear/conventional bombing role.

Operation
Today, H-6 variants are used by the PLAAF (primarily H-6Ks) and PLANAF (primarily H-6Js). Originally PLAAF bombers were used by the eight bomber divisions of the total fifty PLAAF air divisions. At present, PLAAF bombers are found in three conventional bomber divisions assigned to the PLA's theater commands and the nuclear 106th and 23rd Air Brigades. The three conventional bomber divisions of the PLAAF are the 10th Air Division (Eastern Theater Command), 8th Air Division (Southern Theater Command), and 36th Air Division (Central Theater Command). The 10th Air Division is likely responsible for conflicts in the Taiwan Strait or East China Sea, the 8th for conflicts in the South China Sea, and the 36th may be used as a national reserve. H-6s are garrisoned at Anqing, Luhe, Shaodong, Leiyang, Lintong, Wugong, and Neixiang Air Bases.

On 13 July 2017, the Japanese Air Self-Defense Force (JASDF) scrambled jets from Okinawa, intercepted, and photographed six Chinese H-6K bombers conducting long-range drills over the Bashi Channel and Miyako Strait through the Taiwanese, East China Sea, and Japanese Air Defense Identification Zones (ADIZ). A PLA spokesperson told Chinese news service CGTN that the aircraft were "testing actual battle capabilities over the sea" as part of "routine exercises". Two bombers were of the 8th Air Division and the remaining four of the Eastern Theater Command's 10th Air Division. Similarly, on 25 May 2018, the JASDF joined F-16 fighter jets of Taiwanese Air Force in intercepting and photographing two H-6K bombers looping around the Taiwan Island through the Bashi Channel and Miyako Strait. A photo released by the JASDF shows an H-6K of the 8th Air Division, tail number 10192.

In a summer 2021 attempt to demonstrate British commitment to freedom of maritime navigation and challenging Beijing's territorial claims in the South China Sea, the HMS Queen Elizabeth Carrier Strike Group, despite warnings by Chinese Communist Party press, sailed through international waters in the South China Sea. Part of these warnings included China Central Television (CCTV) airing a segment featuring ground crews strapping four YJ-12 anti-ship cruise missiles to hardpoints under the wings of an H-6K of the 24th Air Regiment, 8th Air Division, tail number 11196.

In 2022, at the annual China International Aviation & Aerospace Exhibition (colloquially known as the Zhuhai Airshow), an H-6K of the 8th Air Division's 24th Air Regiment (tail number 11097) was observed carrying what some western defense analysts suspect is the first air-launched model of the CM-401 anti-ship ballistic missile (ASBM).

For years, H-6K bombers of the 10th Air Division's 28th Air Regiment (AR) have routinely joined other military aircraft of the PLAAF (including J-11s, J-16s, Y-8s, Su-30s, KJ-500s, and various UAVs) in unannounced incursions into the Taiwanese and sometimes Japanese Air Defense Identification Zones (ADIZ) carrying a variety of payload munitions. These incursions have gained international attention, especially in annual joint patrols between bombers of the Chinese 28th Air Regiment and Russian Tu-95MS strategic bombers including during meetings of the Quad.

In the PLAAF, H-6 aircrews consist of four personnel: the pilot in command ( or ) who sits in the left pilot seat, the co-pilot who sits to his right, an electronic warfare and communications officer, and a navigator bombardier who may also be referred to as a weapons control technician. Both the electronic warfare and communications officer and the navigator/bombardier sit directly behind the two pilots. Within a larger bomber formation, pilots may serve the role of 'lead pilot' with command over a multiple-bomber formation. When a pilot commands two multiple-bomber formations of the same type, he is referred to as the 'airborne commander'. PLAAF pilots use the term  to describe a wingman.

Variants

New variants were produced in the 1990s: the H-6G was a control platform for ground-launched cruise missiles and the H-6H could carry two land-attack cruise missiles. In terms of the missiles carried, five immediate possibilities were considered by PLAAF: the indigenous HN-1, HN-2, HN-3, DH-10/CJ-10, and a variant of a Russian-designed cruise missile. The CJ-10 was apparently chosen as the main missile carried by the H-6H. Subsequently, the H-6M cruise missile carrier was also introduced, with four pylons for improved cruise missiles and a terrain-following navigation system. Apparently these variants did not include internal weapons bays, and the designs also omitted most or all of the previous defensive gun turrets.

H-6K
The H-6K, first flying on January 5, 2007, entered service in October 2009 during the celebrations of the 60th anniversary of the People's Republic of China, and is claimed to make China the third country with an active strategic bomber after United States and Russia. Six underwing hardpoints for CJ-10A cruise missiles are added. The rear 23 mm guns and gunner position are replaced by electronic components.

The H-6K, known in Mainland China as "God of War", is designed for long-range attacks and stand-off attacks. It is capable of attacking US carrier battle groups and priority targets in Asia. This aircraft has nuclear strike capability. While previous models had limited missile capacity (the H-6G could only carry two YJ-12 anti-ship missiles and the H-6M two KD-20/CJ-10K/CJ-20 land attack cruise missiles), the H-6K can carry up to six YJ-12 and 6-7 ALCMs; a single regiment of 18 H-6Ks fully loaded out with YJ-12s can saturate enemy ships with over 100 supersonic missiles.  Although the aircraft has a new nose radome housing a modern air-to-ground radar, it is not clear if the bomber or other Chinese assets yet have the capability to collect accurate targeting information for successful strikes against point targets in areas beyond the first island chain. An electro-optical targeting system is fitted under the nose.

The WS-18 (or WS-18A) engine may be intended to re-engine the H-6K. The WS-18 - a copy or derivative of the D-30 - began development in 2007 and flight testing in 2015.

In 2015, about 15 H-6Ks were in service.

A H-6K fitted with a refuelling probe may have first flown in December 2016. Besides extending range, a possible mission for the variant may be to launch satellites or ballistic missiles.

Defense Intelligence Agency chief Ashley confirmed that China is developing two new air-launched ballistic missiles, (CH-AS-X-13) one of which can carry a nuclear warhead. The H-6K would be suited to launch such missiles.

In January 2019, Norinco announced it had tested an analog of the American "Mother of all Bombs." Chinese media claimed it could be used for wiping out reinforced buildings and shelters as well as clearing obstacles to create an aircraft landing zone.

In October 2022, Chinese media showcased the prospective concepts of H-6K carrying LJ-1 unmanned aerial system conducting drone swarm tactics. LJ-1 was originally designed as a target practice drone with a modular payload, which could be modified into a decoy or electronic warfare platform.

Production variants
Xian H-6 – (Conventional Bomber) Original, conventional bomber; Tupolev Tu-16 produced under license in China, first flew in 1959. A prototype conducted China’s first aerial nuclear weapon test at Lop Nor on 14 May 1965.
Xian H-6A – (Nuclear Bomber) First Chinese nuclear bomber; developed under Mission 21-511 in parallel with original H-6; modifications include heat-insulated and air-conditioned bomb bay, improved bomb release system, and monitoring equipment for nuclear testing; conducted PRC's first nuclear test on 14 May 1965.
Xian H-6B – (Reconnaissance Aircraft) Developed in parallel with H-6A and outfitted with specialized equipment.
Xian H-6C – (Conventional Bomber) Improved countermeasure suite; initially designated 'H-6III'.
Xian H-6D – (Maritime-Strike Bomber) Anti-ship missile carrier introduced in early 1980s, armed with two air-launched C-601 (Silkworm) missiles, one mounted under each wing; fitted with larger radome under the nose and various improved systems. Later upgraded to either two C-301 supersonic anti-ship missiles, or four C-101 supersonic anti-ship missiles. An upgraded version, capable of carrying four YJ-8 (C-801) anti-ship missiles is currently under development. Initially designated H-6IV.

Xian H-6E – (Nuclear Bomber) Improved countermeasures suite, entered service in 1980s.
Xian H-6F – (Conventional Bomber) New designation for upgraded H-6A and H-6C. Many aircraft upgraded in the 1990s with new inertial navigation systems, doppler navigation radar and GPS receiver.
Xian H-6G – (EW & C3 Aircraft) Provides targeting data to ground-launched cruise missiles, built in the 1990s. No internal bomb bay or defensive armament. Electronic-warfare aircraft with underwing electronic countermeasures pods.
Xian H-6H –  (Cruise Missile Carrier) Land-attack cruise missile carrier armed with two missiles, built in the 1990s. No internal bomb bay or defensive armament.
Xian H-6K – (Conventional Bomber) Latest H-6 variant, re-engined with D-30KP turbofan engines of 12,000 kg thrust replacing the original Chinese turbojets. Other modifications include larger air intakes, re-designed flight deck with smaller/fewer transparencies and large dielectric nose radome.
Xian H-6J – (Maritime-Strike Bomber) Modified H-6K for use by the People’s Liberation Army Navy Air Force (PLANAF) to replace the H-6G; has greater payload and range with performance similar to H-6K.
Xian H-6M – (Cruise Missile Carrier) Fitted with terrain-following system and four under-wing hardpoints for weapons carriage. No internal bomb bay or defensive armament. Production of this variant is believed to have resumed in early 2006.
Xian H-6N – (Nuclear Bomber) Reshaped fuselage in place of the bomb bay to mount an air-launched ballistic missile, likely the CH-AS-X-13 - a variant of the DF-21 anti-ship ballistic missile. It may also carry the CJ-10K/KD-20 or KD-63 land attack cruise missiles. The bomber may have entered service in 2018.
Xian HD-6 – (Electronic Warfare Aircraft) Solid nose and canoe fairing believed to contain electronic counter-measures equipment.

Aerial refueling variants

Xian HY-6 – (Air Refueler) First successful in-flight refuelling tanker variant in Chinese service.  Retained PV-23 fire control system of H-6 and thus can still be deployed as a missile launcher.
Xian HY-6U – (Air Refueler) Modified HY-6 tanker in service with the PLAAF, with PV-23 fire control system and Type 244 radar deleted, and thus a dedicated refueling aircraft Also referred as H-6U
Xian HY-6D – (Naval Air Refueler) First aerial refueling tanker for PLANAF, converted from H-6D.  The most distinct difference between HY-6U and HY-6D is that HY-6U has a metal nose cone, while HY-6D still has the transparent glass nose.  Like the original HY-6, PV-23 fire control system is also retained on HY-6D, which enables the aircraft also to serve as a missile carrying and launching platform.
Xian HY-6DU – (Naval Air Refueler) Aerial refuelling tanker for the PLANAF, modified HY-6D, also referred as H-6DU.  Similar to HY-6U, HY-6DU is a dedicated aerial refueling tanker when its PV-23 fire control system is removed from the aircraft.

Export variants
Xian B-6D – (Maritime Strike Bomber) Export version of the H-6D.

Testbeds, prototypes and proposed variants

Xian H-6I – Modified version powered by four Rolls-Royce Spey Mk 512 turbofan engines, originally purchased as spare engines for Hawker Siddeley Tridents in service with CAAC. Modifications included a lengthened fuselage and smaller engine nacelles with smaller air intakes in the wing roots, where the original two turbojet engines were replaced with two Spey turbofans. Two more Spey engines mounted on pylons, one under each wing, outboard of the undercarriage sponsons. Ferry range increased to 8,100 km (with standard payload), and combat radius increased to over 5,000 km (with nuclear payload). Development began in 1970, maiden flight took place in 1978 and state certification received in the following year.
H-6 Engine Testbed – One H-6, serial number # 086, was converted into an engine testbed. Remained in service for 20 years until replacement by a converted Ilyushin Il-76.
H-6 Launch Vehicle – Proposed variant intended to launch a 13 tonne Satellite Launch Vehicle at an altitude of 10,000 m. In 2000 preliminary studies began on the air-launched, all solid propellant SLV, capable of placing a payload of 50 kg in earth orbit. Mock-up of the SLV and H-6 launch platform shown during 2006 Zhuhai Air Show.

Operators

Current operators

People's Liberation Army Air Force (PLAAF) — 231+ H-6 aircraft in active service as of November, 2020. Units operating the H-6 principally include the 8th, 10th, and 36th Air Divisions.
People's Liberation Army Naval Air Force (PLANAF) — Operates the H-6G and H-6J naval variants.

Former operators

Egyptian Air Force — Previously a long-time operator of the Soviet Tu-16, after Egypt switched alliances from the Soviet Union to the United States, the Egyptian Air Force imported an undetermined number of H-6 bombers, the last of which were retired in 2000.

Iraqi Air Force — Near the conclusion of the Iran–Iraq War, the Iraqi Air Force received four H-6D bombers and fifty C-601 "Silkworm" anti-ship cruise missiles (ASCMs) in 1987. The first ship to be hit by a Silkworm missile was the Iranian freighter Entekhab on 5 February 1988. The Iraqi Air Force scored hits on a further fourteen tankers and bulk carriers using the Soviet-gifted H-6Ds and Silkworms. One Iraqi H-6D was shot down by an American-gifted Iranian F-14 Tomcat jet during the war, the remaining three H-6Ds were destroyed by the United States bombing of Al Taqaddum Air Base in the 1991 Persian Gulf War.

Specifications

The following specifications come from the H-6

See also

References

Bibliography

External links

H-6 Bomber Family, AirForceWorld.com
H-6 Medium Bomber, Sinodefence.Com
Xian H-6 Badger, Ausairpower.Net
Xian H-8 Chinese Stealth Bomber Project
Chinese Aircraft - H-8
Ministry Of National Defense R.O.C-Default

Air refueling
China–Soviet Union relations
1960s Chinese bomber aircraft
H-06
Twinjets
Mid-wing aircraft
Aircraft first flown in 1959